Hand of the Cause was a title given to prominent early members of the Baháʼí Faith, appointed for life by the religion's founders. Of the fifty individuals given the title, the last living was ʻAlí-Muhammad Varqá who died in 2007. Hands of the Cause played a significant role in propagating the religion, and protecting it from schism. 

With the passing of Shoghi Effendi in 1957, the twenty-seven living Hands of the Cause at the time would be the last appointed. The Universal House of Justice, the governing body first elected in 1963, created the Institution of the Counsellors in 1968 and the appointed Continental Counsellors over time took on the role that the Hands of the Cause were filling. The announcement in 1968 also changed the role of the Hand of the Cause, changing them from continental appointments to worldwide, and nine Counsellors working at the International Teaching Centre took on the role of the nine Hands of the Cause who worked in the Baháʼí World Centre. 

The most complete list of the Hands available is from The Baháʼí World: Vol XIV. The Universal House of Justice has said that this list may not be complete, and that a study of the letters and archives may reveal others named to this position.

Responsibilities
‘Abdu’l-Baha in his will and testament asks the Hands of the Cause of God to be "ever watchful" and "so soon as they find anyone beginning to oppose and protest against the Guardian of the Cause of God, cast him out from the congregation of the people of Baha and in no wise accept any excuse from him."

The Hands of the Cause are also referred to by Shoghi Effendi as the "Chief Stewards of Baháʼu'lláh's embryonic World Commonwealth".

Appointments
Four Hands were named by Baháʼu'lláh, four by ʻAbdu'l-Bahá and forty-two by Shoghi Effendi (including ten posthumously).

Appointed by Baháʼu'lláh 
Adíb (1848–1919)
Hají Ákhúnd (1842–1910)
Ibn-i-Asdaq (d.1928)
Ibn-i-Abhar (d.1917)

Appointed posthumously by ʻAbdu'l-Bahá 
Muhammad-Ridá (Mullá Muhammad Ábádí Yazdí)
Nabíl-i-Akbar (1829–1892)
Ismu'lláhu'l-Asdaq (d. 1889) (Mullá Sádiq Khurasani)
Varqá (d. 1896)

Appointed posthumously by Shoghi Effendi
John Ebenezer Esslemont (1874–1925)
Hájí Amín (1831–1928)
Keith Ransom-Kehler (1876–1933)
Martha Root (1872–1939)
John Henry Hyde Dunn (1855–1941)
Siyyid Mustafá Rúmí (d. 1942)
'Abdu'l-Jalil Bey Sa'd (d. 1942)
Muhammed Taqiy-i-Isfáhani (d. 1946)
Roy C. Wilhelm (1875–1951)
Louis George Gregory (1874–1951)

Appointed individually by Shoghi Effendi [year of appointment] 
Amatu'l-Bahá Rúḥíyyih K͟hánum (1910–2000)  [1952]
Jalál K͟háḍih (1897–1990) [1953] (also transliterated Jalal Khazeh)
Paul Edmond Haney (1909–1982) [1954]
ʻAlí-Muhammad Varqá (1911–2007) [1955]
Agnes Baldwin Alexander (1875–1971) [1957]

First contingent, appointed 24 December 1951 by Shoghi Effendi 
Dorothy Beecher Baker (1898–1954)
Amelia Engelder Collins (1873–1962)
ʻAlí-Akbar Furútan (1905–2003)
Ugo Giachery (1896–1989)
Hermann Grossmann (1899–1968)
Horace Hotchkiss Holley (1887–1960)
Leroy C. Ioas (1896–1965)
William Sutherland Maxwell (1874–1952)
Taráz'u'lláh Samandarí (1874–1968)
Valíyu'lláh Varqá (1884–1955)
George Townshend (1876–1957)
Charles Mason Remey (1874–1974)

Second contingent, appointed 29 February 1952 by Shoghi Effendi 
Siegfried Schopflocher (1877–1953)
S͟hu'á'u'lláh ʻAláʼí (1889–1984)
Músá Banání (1886–1971)
Clara Dunn (1869–1960)
D͟hikru'lláh K͟hádim (1904–1986)
Adelbert Mühlschlegel (1897–1980)
Corinne Knight True (1861–1961)

Last contingent, appointed 2 October 1957 by Shoghi Effendi 
Hasan Muvaqqar Balyúzí (1908–1980)
Abu'l-Qásim Faizi (1906–1980)
John Graham Ferraby (1914–1973)
Harold Collis Featherstone (1913–1990)
Rahmatu'lláh Muhájir (1923–1979)
Enoch Olinga (1926–1979)
John Aldham Robarts (1901–1991)
William Sears (1911–1992)

Custodians
During the period between the death of Shoghi Effendi and the election of the Universal House of Justice the Hands of the Cause held a convocation from which they constituted a body of nine from among their number to serve in the Holy Land and to act as Custodians of the Baháʼí Faith, a body which functioned without officers and with a quorum of five, whose duties included taking care of Baháʼí World Center properties and other assets; corresponding with and advising National and Regional Spiritual Assemblies; acting on behalf of the Baháʼí Faith for its protection; and maintaining close contact with the rest of the Hands, who would henceforth devote their time to the successful completion of the goals of the Ten Year Crusade. The Hands of the Cause maintained the number of Custodians, replacing those who died or were unable, for health or personal reasons, to remain at the Baháʼí World Center permanently.

The idea of a group of nine elected from among the Hands of the Cause to stay at the Baha'i World Centre was referred to in the Will and Testament of ʻAbdu'l-Bahá, one of the defining documents of Baháʼí administration. This body of nine was given the duty to validate any appointments made as Guardian:
"The Hands of the Cause of God must elect from their own number nine persons that shall at all times be occupied in the important services in the work of the Guardian of the Cause of God. The election of these nine must be carried either unanimously or by majority from the company of the Hands of the Cause of God and these, whether unanimously or by a majority vote, must give their assent to the choice of the one whom the Guardian of the Cause of God hath chosen as his successor."

Ministry (1957–1963)
In 1957 after the unexpected death of Shoghi Effendi while he was travelling to Britain, the living Hands of the Cause gathered in Haifa and elected nine members that would retain the leadership of the religion until the Universal House of Justice was elected in 1963. All eligible appointees as Guardian had been excommunicated and no appointment had been made by Shoghi Effendi, so they left the situation to be decided by the Universal House of Justice, which had the scriptural authority to legislate on matters that were unaddressed in the religion's texts.

In a statement released by the complete body of the Hands of the Cause they wrote:

We the undersigned:

in our capacity as Hands of the Cause of God duly nominated and appointed by the Guardian of the Baháʼí Faith, His Eminence the late Shoghi Effendi Rabbani, assembled this 25 November 1957 at the Baháʼí World Centre and constituting the supreme body of the Baháʼí World Community

DO HEREBY UNANIMOUSLY RESOLVE AND PROCLAIM AS FOLLOWS:

WHEREAS THE Guardian of the Baháʼí Faith, His Eminence the late Shoghi Effendi Rabbani, died in London (England) on 4 November 1957, without having appointed his successor;

AND WHEREAS it is now fallen upon us as Chief Stewards of the Baháʼí World Faith to preserve the unity, the security and the development of the Baháʼí World Community and all its institutions;

AND WHEREAS in accordance with the Will and Testament of ʻAbdu'l-Bahá) "the Hands of the Cause of God must elect from their own number nine persons that shall at all times be occupied in the important services in the work of the Guardian of the Cause of God"; 

We nominate and appoint from our own number to act on our behalf as the Custodians of the Baháʼí World Faith

Ruhiyyih Rabbani
Charles Mason Remey
Amelia E. Collins
Leroy C. Ioas
Hasan Balyuzi
ʻAlí-Akbar Furútan
Jalal Khazeh
Paul E. Haney
Adelbert Muhlschlegel

to exercise -- subject to such directions and decisions as may be given from time to time by us as the Chief Stewards of the Baháʼí World Faith -- all such functions, rights and powers in succession to the Guardian of the Baháʼí Faith, His Eminence the late Shoghi Effendi Rabbani, as are necessary to serve the interests of the Baháʼí World Faith, and this until such time as the Universal House of Justice, upon being duly established and elected in conformity with the Sacred Writings of Baháʼu'lláh and the Will and Testament of ʻAbdu'l-Bahá, may otherwise determine.

In 1959 Mason Remey and Hasan Balyuzi found that they could no longer serve in a permanent capacity as Custodian of the Faith at the Baháʼí World Centre, and thus John Ferraby and Horace Holley were selected to replace them as Custodians. Then in 1960 after the death of Horace Holley, William Sears was elected to replace him and serve as a Custodian.

Closing of their office

The Custodians called for the election of the Universal House of Justice at the close of the Ten Year Crusade in 1963 and excluded themselves from being electable to that institution.

Upon the election of the Universal House of Justice the Custodians closed their office and turned to that newly elected body. They announced:
"WE, THE UNDERSIGNED, DULY NOMINATED AND APPOINTED AS CUSTODIANS OF THE BAHAʼI WORLD FAITH BY THE DECLARATION OF THE HANDS OF THE CAUSE OF GOD MADE AT BAHJI ON NOVEMBER 25TH, 1957... do now declare that the Universal House of Justice was so established and elected by action of the International Baháʼí Convention held at Haifa on April 21st, 22nd and 23rd, 1963 and we hereby release all the said functions, rights and powers which were conferred upon us under the said Declaration of November 25th, 1957 as determined by the Universal House of Justice in its communication of June 7th, 1963, and we declare that all the said functions, rights and powers now devolve rightfully and in full accordance with the Sacred Writings of the Baháʼí Faith upon the Universal House of Justice. We make this statement for the full body of the Hands of the Cause of God in accordance with the powers conferred upon us by the Declaration of November 25th, 1957, and the office of Custodians of the Baháʼí World Faith has thus ceased to exist."

See also
Apostles of Baháʼu'lláh
Disciples of ʻAbdu'l-Bahá
Institution of the Counsellors
Letters of the Living

Notes

References

External links
Portraits of the Hands of the Cause

Fadil-i-Mazandarani - House of Justice message of 1998 concerning the status and rank of Fadil-i-Mazandarani.

 
19th-century establishments in Asia